Castle Quarter, formerly known as Castle Mall (and The Mall Norwich for a while) is a shopping centre in Norwich, Norfolk, England, UK. It opened on 23 September 1993. It's one of 2 shopping centres in Norwich City Centre, the other being Chantry Place, which is only a 5-minute walk from each other.

History 
The plans for the centre go back to 1977 when Michael Inns, an architect, came up with a plan for a shopping centre in Norwich City Centre. He originally planned it to be at Timber Hill however that was rejected by the local council because of concerns of some listed buildings would be affected by it. So instead he chose it would be located by the old cattle market by Norwich Castle, which he thought would be a great location for the mall. He came up with the idea that the centre would be underground and would be connected with Norwich Market and Castle Meadow. However, despite his plans, it would be 13 years before the construction begins.

Because of the centre being built on historical sites, an archaeological dig was setup around the area between 1987 and 1991 and it was one of the biggest in northern Europe. Construction finally began in March 1990 and ended in 1993. The first phase would be the demolition of the former Castle Hotel, a 5 star hotel that closed in 1989. Several months after the hotel was demolished, the tunnel was excavated below Castle Meadow to make the tunnel and most of the place.

The centre finally opened as Castle Mall on 23 September 1993 and it cost £145 million. The centre included an Argos, Disney Store, Virgin Megastore, Boots (which still remains in the centre to this day) and a food court and various other shops. In 1999, an unoccupied area of the centre was redeveloped to a cinema (which is currently a Vue). This was when the place was during its peak. The centre was sold to The Mall Fund in the 2000s and was renamed to The Mall Norwich.

However, in 2005 is considered the beginning of the downfall of the centre because of Chantry Place (then known as Chapelfield) opened. The centre lost major stores including The Disney Store and H&M, who moved to Chapelfield. Things became worse as the 2008 Stock Market Crash and the Great Recession made more shops leave.

In 2012, the centre was sold yet again to InfraRed and was renamed back to Castle Mall. The centre got a new dining quarter in 2015, called the Timberhill Terrace.

In mid 2019, the centre was renamed to Castle Quarter. The owners want Castle Quarter to be more of an entertainment centre and not just a shopping centre.

Features 
Castle Quarter features stores, Flying Tiger, Boots, Select, TK Maxx, Poundland and more. The centre also has a Vue cinema and a Super Bowl bowling alley. Castle Quarter has a food court which features Burger King, Chopstix, Spudulike and Southern Fried Chicken, however the food court is closed as its currently a COVID-19 Vaccination Centre. There is also the Timberhill Terrace which also contains restaurants.

References

External links 
 https://castlequarternorwich.co.uk/

Norwich
Shopping centres in Norfolk